Kamisetty Ramamohan Rao was an Indian-American electrical engineer. He was a professor of Electrical Engineering at the University of Texas at Arlington (UT Arlington). Academically known as K. R. Rao, he is credited with the co-invention of discrete cosine transform (DCT), along with Nasir Ahmed and T. Natarajan due to their landmark publication, Discrete Cosine Transform.

Education
Rao received a Bachelor of Science in Electrical Engineering from the College of Engineering, Guindy, affiliated with the University of Madras, in 1952. In 1959, he received his Master of Science Electrical Engineering degree from the University of Florida in 1959 followed by a Master of Science in Nuclear Engineering from the University of Florida in 1960. He received a Ph.D. degree in Electrical Engineering from the University of New Mexico, Albuquerque in 1966.

Career
Rao had been with the University of Texas at Arlington since 1966. He was a professor of electrical engineering, and the director of the Multimedia Processing Laboratory. He also taught undergraduate courses on Discrete Signals and Systems and Fundamentals of Telecommunication systems. He also taught graduate courses on Digital Video Coding, Digital Image Processing, Discrete Transforms, and Multimedia Processing.

He had been an external examiner for graduate students from universities in Australia, Canada, Hong Kong, India, Singapore, Thailand, and Taiwan. He was a visiting professor at universities in Australia, India, Japan, Korea, Singapore, and Thailand. He conducted workshops/tutorials on video/audio coding/standards worldwide. He advised more than a hundred graduate students. He published in refereed journals and has been a consultant to industry, research institutes, law firms, and academia.

He was a Fellow of the IEEE. He is a member of the Academy of Distinguished Scholars, UTA. He was invited to be a panelist for the 2011 NSF Graduate Research Fellowship Program (GRFP), with service on the Electrical Engineering Panel.
He was a panelist for the US EPA STAR fellowship program during 2013 and 2015 in Chantilly, Virginia.

Discrete cosine transform

Rao, along with Nasir Ahmed and T. Natarajan, introduced the discrete cosine transform (DCT) in 1974 which has since become very popular in digital signal processing.  DCT, INTDCT, directional DCT and MDCT (modified DCT) have been adopted in several international video/image/audio coding standards such as JPEG/MPEG/H.26X series and also by SMPTE (VC-1) and by AVS China.

Publications

See also
 JPEG – This article contains an easily understood example of DCT transformation
 Modified discrete cosine transform
 Discrete sine transform
 Discrete Fourier transform
 List of Fourier-related transforms

References

External links
Books by Dr Rao, Books
IEEE Fellow Citation (He was elected Fellow of the IEEE for contributions to the theory and practice of image and video compression.)
Dr Rao's faculty page at UTA
Multimedia Processing Lab's page at UTA

1931 births
2021 deaths
American electrical engineers
Fellow Members of the IEEE
University of Florida College of Engineering alumni
University of New Mexico alumni
University of Texas at Arlington faculty
Sainik School alumni
American academics of Indian descent
Indian scholars